Hirata may refer to:

Places
Hirata, Fukushima, former village in Fukushima Prefecture, Japan
Hirata, Gifu, former town in Gifu Prefecture, Japan
Hirata, Shimane, former city in Shimane Prefecture, Japan
Hirata, Yamagata, former town in Yamagata Prefecture, Japan

Other uses
Hirata (surname)
Hirata Station (disambiguation), multiple train stations in Japan